Volvo Car Gent (until 2007 known as  Volvo Cars Europe Industry N.V.) is an automobile manufacturer located in the port district of Ghent/Gent in western Belgium. By about 2013 the Ghent plant had become the Volvo plant manufacturing most cars. The company is a wholly owned subsidiary of the Swedish automaker Volvo Personvagnar AB (Volvo Cars). It is owned by Volvo Car Belgium NV. Its activities comprise welding, painting and final assembly. The plant became the only car manufacturing plant in Flanders after Ford Genk closed at the end of 2014.

The plant opened in 1965. It was the first European Volvo plant outside Sweden. The Ghent location was chosen because it was centrally positioned within the EEC and was supported by a good transport infrastructure.

The first Volvo produced in Ghent was the company’s 120 Series (120/121/122, later 130), also known as Amazon. In September 2012 the plant was producing the Volvo C30, Volvo V40, Volvo S60 and Volvo XC60 models, of which the XC60 was the top seller, thanks in part to tax advantages available in certain key markets for the DRIVe version. In 2011 the company was hoping to match the 258,000 units of output achieved in 2005, the plant’s top production year till that point.

In 2015 the Ghent plant employed about 5,400 people. Volvo Car Gent produced 252,479 cars (XC60, V40 and S60) in 2015. In 2017 Volvo Car Gent started to produce the first new vehicle on the CMA platform (Compact Modular Architecture), the XC40.

In 2020, the Ghent plant began to produce Volvo's first mass-market electric car, the XC40 Recharge. In 2021, the electric-only C40 began production at Gent.

The city of Ghent is also home to a Volvo truck plant. This plant is part of Volvo Group Belgium and, apart from the Volvo brand name, is no longer linked to the car activities in Belgium. This plant was formerly known as Volvo Europa Truck.

In November 2016 the 6th million car was produced.

Name
The plant's name is Volvo Car Gent and not Volvo Cars Ghent. It is a proper name in which the city name is in its original Dutch spelling, not in English.

References

External links
volvocargent.be (Dutch, French & English)
volvocars.com (Global)
Volvo Car Gent N.V. on WikiMapia

Ghent
Volvo Cars
Volvo factories
Motor vehicle assembly plants in Belgium
Companies based in East Flanders
Industrial buildings completed in 1965
1965 establishments in Belgium